(born July 15, 1969) is a Japanese former volleyball player who competed in the 1996 Summer Olympics.

In 1996 she was eliminated with the Japanese team in the preliminary round of the Olympic tournament.

External links
 

1969 births
Living people
Japanese women's volleyball players
Olympic volleyball players of Japan
Volleyball players at the 1996 Summer Olympics
Asian Games medalists in volleyball
Volleyball players at the 1994 Asian Games
Medalists at the 1994 Asian Games
Asian Games bronze medalists for Japan
Goodwill Games medalists in volleyball
Competitors at the 1994 Goodwill Games